Chiara Passa (born 1973) is a visual artist working in media art since the second half of the 1990s.

Her artistic research analyses differences in virtual spaces through a variety of techniques - often using augmented reality and virtual reality technologies. She works with animation and interactive video-installation, digital art in public space as site-specific artworks and Projection mapping, video sculpture, art-applications and Widget (GUI) for mobile platforms.

Main artworks 
In 1996, Passa began her work in animation and video-installation, which has been described as a constant study of the figure, geometric and essential, combined with a three-dimensional and dynamic vision of the virtual space.
In 1999, Passa coined the term "Super Place" as a reference for "Extens(z)ion Projects" and later for "Live Architectures" - a series of digital artworks developed over time and based on the concept of "super place" where the site is self-performing and moves beyond its capabilities, reflecting on the idea of the virtual/unreal and how human bodies, in real space, are related to this kind of dimension/experience.

Passa's artistic research mainly explores architecture as interface, for example in the virtual reality series "Dimensioning" that aims to create a multi-dimensional extension of the space, allowing visitors to navigate into a moving 360¬∞ area.
The net-art series "Extemporary Land Art on Google Earth" aims to create an extemporary-temporary virtual land-art through augmented reality technology, constructing and re-constructing a sort of "mise en abyme" or "droste effect" in which an element shifts the other in depth. The Google earth environment merges with the augmented area in order to create a new space. "Live sculpture" is an interactive software-artwork where the body of the viewer is fully involved and becoming a three-dimensional marble sculpture constituted by variable virtual meshes. In 2005 Passa created the blog-art project "ideasonair.net-blogging as an open art project" (2005-2012 online archive). This was a conceptual net-artwork in progress that put into practice the concept of "open artwork", creating and sharing many artistic ideas in various fields between artists, curators, critics and art lovers.

In 2009 (ongoing) Passa created and developed "The Widget Art Gallery", a web-app as virtual gallery, which every two months hosts a solo digital art exhibition (supporting digital artists) related to and inspired by its dynamic site-specific context. The "Widget Art Gallery" works both as a gallery showing temporary exhibitions and as a permanent collection museum, conserving all the past exhibitions inside an online archive.

Further reading

 David England, Thecla Schiphorst, Nick Bryan-Kinns (June 2016). Curating the Digital: Space for Art and Interaction. Book Widget Art Gallery, pages 10,11 Edition Springer  
 Insideart Magazine n.107 - 9771974190004 60107 (10/2016). Focus: The second space, the virtual one (pg. 78-83). By Francesco Angelucci. 
 Polveroni Adriana (February 9, 2003) “Stravolgi il videogame diventerai un artista” (ita) La Repubblica.
 TRECCANI - Enciclopedia Italiana di scienze, lettere ed arti. Nona appendice, Internet art; Net art; Web art (Roma 2015). .
 Elena Giulia Rossi (30 June 2016) "Michael Andrews, A Fiber Artist at the Widget Art Gallery". Arshake
 Corinna Kirsch (25 December 2015) "GIF of the Day: Chiara Passa" GIF of the Day: Chiara Passa
 Nara Shin (6 May 2015), From Cool Hunting Magazine - Net-Art “Flashcrash at the Widget Art Gallery”.
 EVA: Electronic visualization technologies and the arts (July 2015, London). BCS book  
 R. Bosco and S. Caldana "Un artista en el banner - Chiara Passa the fourth dimension banner" (23 April 2014), El Pais (technological blog). 
 J. Potts (2014) "The Future of Writing." Editions Palgarve Macmillan. eBook . Hardcover 
 Antonello Tolve (2013) Ubiquità - Arte e critica d'arte nell'epoca del policentrismo planetario’ ed. Quodlibet. ; includes a chapter on the Widget Art Gallery.
 Silvia Scaravaggi "SUONI E IMMAGINI NELLO SPAZIO interview on Chiara Passa" (issue-040, 2009). Digicult Magazine
 Vito Campanelli, (2011) “Culture and New Media: 5 Questions by Lev Manovich”. Mao Editions .
 Filippo Lorenzin (September 23, 2013) Gallerie d’arte online. Intervista con Chiara Passa, Artribune
 Rob Myers (1 September 2013) "A Symbol" Bill Miller at The Widget Art Gallery. Furtherfield
 Andrea Bruciati, Antonella Crippa (2004) "On air"  editions Silvana (English/Italian)

References

External links

 
 Ideasonair-Blogging as an open art project
 Video presentation of the solo show at FurtherField gallery, London 2016
 Talk/presentation of "Live sculpture" at EVA-Electronic Visualization Arts, London 2015
 Talk/presentation of "The Widget Art Gallery" at Media Art Histories Conference, Riga 2013

1973 births
New media artists
Italian contemporary artists
Living people